Hymenobacter cavernae is a Gram-negative, rod-shaped and non-motile  bacterium from the genus of Hymenobacter which has been isolated from a karst cave from Guizhou in China.

References 

cavernae
Bacteria described in 2017